Allah Deh (also Romanized as Allāh Deh; also known as Alladi and Allyady) is a village in Khaleh Sara Rural District, Asalem District, Talesh County, Gilan Province, Iran. At the 2006 census, its population was 547, in 142 families.

References 

Populated places in Talesh County